Evgeny Solovyov (born February 14, 1992) is a Russian ice hockey player. He is currently playing with Khimik Voskresensk of the Supreme Hockey League (VHL).

Solovyov previously played in the Kontinental Hockey League with HC Donbass, Metallurg Magnitogorsk and Metallurg Norilsk. He played 61 games in the KHL, scoring 14 goals and 5 assists.

References

External links

1992 births
Living people
HC Donbass players
HC Khimik Voskresensk players
Metallurg Magnitogorsk players
Metallurg Novokuznetsk players
People from Novouralsk
Russian ice hockey forwards
Stalnye Lisy players
Tsen Tou Jilin City players
Yuzhny Ural Orsk players
Zauralie Kurgan players
Universiade medalists in ice hockey
Universiade gold medalists for Russia
Competitors at the 2015 Winter Universiade
Sportspeople from Sverdlovsk Oblast